Jane Pitfield,  (born ) is a former Toronto city councillor, representing one of the two Don Valley West wards.  She ran unsuccessfully for Mayor of Toronto in 2006. She is currently the warden of Pontiac Regional County Municipality, Quebec.

Background
A graduate of Queen's University, she worked for several years with Procter & Gamble.  In 1989 she founded Concerned Citizens of Leaside to oppose a large development project. She is also the author of  Leaside, a history of the neighbourhood.

She is married to Robert H. Pitfield, a former senior executive with the Bank of Nova Scotia and now Executive Chairman of the Board, TravelEdge Group. They have four children, three daughters and a son. Her uncle-in-law is Ward C. Pitfield, Jr. (1937-2017), who was chairman of brokerage firm Dominion Securities. Another uncle-in-law, Senator Michael Pitfield, was clerk of the Privy Council under former prime minister Pierre Trudeau.

As of 2017, Pitfield was attempting to attract government funding to create a greenhouse in Gaultois, a small Newfoundland community.

Politics

School trustee
In 1994, she was elected as a school board trustee in East York's Ward 4.

City councillor
In the first post-amalgamation election in 1997, she ran for city councillor in Ward 1, East York but came third behind winners Michael Prue and Case Ootes.  It was later decided, however, that the East York ward was too large for only two councillors. A by-election was held to elect a third councillor and she won this race. In May 1999 she became chair of the East York Community Council. In November 2000 she was elected in a reorganized council in the riding/ward of Don Valley West.

During the 2003 term of office she served as chair of the Works Committee. In 2004, she proposed a 9% water rate increase in early 2004, a higher figure than city staff had recommended.  Following intervention from the office of mayor David Miller, the increase was reduced to 6%.  Pitfield justified the proposed increase by saying, "This is not to be thought of as taxation. It's a user fee. If you want to pay less, you can use less."

A Globe and Mail report from March 2005 indicated that Pitfield canvassed for Progressive Conservative Party of Ontario leader John Tory during his provincial by-election campaign in Dufferin—Peel—Wellington—Grey.

After the 2003 election, Miller called in councillors to pick committee chair heads. Pitfield says she did not get a call. "So I called him", she said. She asked to be chair of the works committee, and was appointed. In the mid-term committee chair shuffle, Pitfield left the works and budget committees and joined the audit committee and co-chaired the aboriginal affairs committee.

2006 mayoral race
On November 29, 2005, Pitfield announced that she would run against mayor David Miller in the 2006 municipal election.

Pitfield promised to hold off on future tax increases and adopted the slogan, "Always think like a taxpayer". Pitfield also stated that the Mayor should be known as the "Billion Dollar Man" for increasing the city's spending by $1.3 billion since he became mayor in 2003. Miller responded by observing that Toronto's share of the new spending was only $275 million, with the remainder coming from the provincial and federal governments. He later added that most of the spending "is new investment we've secured from provincial and federal government to meet the needs of our city in public transit, in housing, or the 58 new child care centres that we've opened in Toronto this month alone, in Toronto's poorest neighbourhoods".

Pitfield's campaign team included Michael Marzolini, pollster and strategist for former Liberal prime minister Jean Chrétien, and John Foden, Public Affairs consultant. Ontario PC Party treasurer Vic Gupta, who was deputy campaign manager for John Tory's 2003 run for mayor, was on Pitfield's campaign team but bowed out in June 2006, and became lobbyist for the Toronto Port Authority.

In September 2006, Pitfield voted in favour of a bid by Toronto City Council to purchase a landfill site that she had previously spoken against.  She claimed that she voted yes in error and admitted to being embarrassed by her mistake. She indicated that she would try to have her vote changed in the official records but wasn't able to reopen the debate to change her vote.

On September 29, the National Post released a survey conducted by Ipsos-Reid that suggested Pitfield was a stronger challenger to Miller than many people believed. The poll showed that of decided voters, 55% would support Miller, while 40% would support Pitfield.  In the "absolutely certain" voter category, 51% would support Miller while 46% would support Pitfield.  On the same day, former Liberal Party of Canada President Stephen LeDrew also entered the contest.

Her platform to be mayor included a public housing program focused on home ownership for low-income families. She accused Miller of being soft on crime and called for a police helicopter, a weapons court and restrictions on bail for individuals with outstanding violent crime charges.  She was in favour of incinerating Toronto's garbage as part of a waste-to energy scheme, as opposed to transporting it by road to Michigan, and set a 60% diversion rate for recycling. She supported building two kilometres of subway per year.

Miller won the contest by a significant margin.

2006 results

After mayoral attempt
In 2008, Pitfield was elected president of the Caledon Heritage Foundation. She and her family own a 19th-century house in Caledon which they are in the process of restoring.

In 2008, she published a book called Leaside which chronicles the foundation and growth of her local neighbourhood called Leaside.

2010 municipal election
In January 2010, Pitfield announced that she would run for councillor in East York, Ward 29, to replace Case Ootes following his retirement. She was defeated by newcomer Mary Fragedakis by nearly 2,500 votes.

2010 results

Pontiac Warden
In 2017, Pitfield was elected Warden of the Pontiac Regional County Municipality under her maiden name Jane Toller. She moved to Pontiac becoming a local business person (operator of Pontiac Conference Centre) and President of Tourism Pontiac.

Her great-great grandfather, George Bryson, served as Warden of Pontiac from 1862 to 1863.

Pitfield has also owned and operated the Gaultois Inn on the south coast of Newfoundland since 2011.

2017 results

2021 results

References

Notes

Citations

Books

External links

City biography

1954 births
Ontario school board trustees
Women municipal councillors in Canada
Living people
People from Peterborough, Ontario
Toronto city councillors
Women in Ontario politics
People from Outaouais
Women in Quebec politics
Quebec municipal politicians